Vladimír Kudrna (22 December 1923 – 2 November 1991) was a Czech sports shooter. He competed at the 1960 Summer Olympics and the 1964 Summer Olympics.

References

1923 births
1991 deaths
Czech male sport shooters
Olympic shooters of Czechoslovakia
Shooters at the 1960 Summer Olympics
Shooters at the 1964 Summer Olympics
Sportspeople from Prague